Wise Guys is the only studio album by American Southern hip hop group Ghetto Commission. It was released on November 10, 1998, via No Limit/Priority Records. Production was handled by Beats By The Pound, with Master P serving as executive producer. It features guest appearances from Fiend, Magic, Master P, C-Murder, Mac, Mr. Serv-On, Mystikal, Prime Suspects, QB and Silkk the Shocker. The album peaked at number 59 on the Billboard 200 and number 12 on the Top R&B/Hip-Hop Albums chart.

Track listing

Charts

References

External links

1998 debut albums
No Limit Records albums
Priority Records albums
Ghetto Commission albums